P61 or P-61 may refer to:

Vessels
 , a patrol boat of the Royal Bahamas Defence Force
 , a submarine of the Royal Navy
 , a corvette of the Indian Navy
 , an offshore patrol vessel of the Irish Naval Service
 
 Polemistis (P61), a HSY-55-class gunboat of the Hellenic Navy

Other uses
 Northrop P-61 Black Widow, an American night fighter aircraft
 BRM P61, a Formula One racing car
 P61 road (Ukraine)
 Papyrus 61, a biblical manuscript
 P61, a state regional road in Latvia
 Sea Tiger (P61), a fictional submarine in the film We Dive at Dawn